Dhudianwala  is a village in Kapurthala district of Punjab State, India. The village is administrated by a Sarpanch, who is an elected representative.

Demography 
According to the report published by Census India in 2011, Dhudianwala has a total number of 686 houses and population of 3,167 of which include 1,669 males and 1,498 females. Literacy rate of Dhudianwala is  82.69%, higher than state average of 75.84%.  The population of children under the age of 6 years is 389 which is 12.28% of total population of Dhudianwala, and child sex ratio is approximately  898, higher than state average of 846.

As per census 2011, 1,009 people were engaged in work activities out of the total population of Dhudianwala which includes 851 males and 158 females. According to census survey report 2011, 98.41% workers describe their work as main work and 1.59% workers are involved in Marginal activity providing livelihood for less than 6 months.

Population data

Caste  
The village has schedule caste (SC) constitutes 20.27% of total population of the village and it doesn't have any Schedule Tribe (ST) population.

Air travel connectivity 
The closest airport to the village is Sri Guru Ram Dass Jee International Airport.

Villages in Kapurthala

External links
  Villages in Kapurthala
 Kapurthala Villages List

References

Villages in Kapurthala district